Lyndhurst is a New Jersey Transit rail station located off of New York Avenue in Lyndhurst, New Jersey. The station is one of two in Lyndhurst, the other being Kingsland station. The Lyndhurst station is located at milepost 8.2 on the Main Line.

History
The Boonton Branch of the Delaware, Lackawanna and Western Railroad was first constructed as a freight bypass of the Morris & Essex Railroad in 1868. This was constructed due to the lack of freight along its passenger lines and stretched from the Denville station to Hoboken Terminal via Boonton and Paterson.

Formerly part of the Lackawanna Boonton Branch, the brick station was built 1928 to replace an older wood facility. The historic station is part of the New Jersey Register of Historic Places Delaware, Lackawanna and Western Railroad Boonton Line Historic District (ID#4895),

Renovation
On June 22, 2010, the town of Lyndhurst put forward a proposal to buy the station depots at both Lyndhurst and sister Kingsland stations. The mayor of Lyndhurst, Richard DiLascio, said that the stations have seen better days and New Jersey Transit has no interest in renovating both buildings, rather selling both at a fee to the town of Lyndhurst. As of 2012, the station building was unoccupied. The town of Lyndhurst has requested that NJT lease the building to the municipality so that it might be renovated and brought into use as a way to revitalize the immediate vicinity.

During the summer of 2011 the Lyndhurst station went under some minor renovations, including new stair supports and a new roof over a portion of the southern (eastbound) platform. In August 2012, NJT announced that the $2.5 million would be spent to make the station compliant with the Americans with Disabilities Act of 1990 (ADA). It also stated funding for a total renovation costing approximately $26 million had been identified, but that the plan was in preliminary stages.

According to NJT, there are plans to renovate the historic station and make it ADA compliant at cost estimated in 2014 to be $22 million, though as of July 2014 there were no design or construction contracts.
There are two lengthy flights of wooden stairs to reach both the eastbound and westbound tracks, the platforms of which are particularly low and in state of disrepair. Work would include raising the platforms and making the station house accessible.

As of March 6, 2019, plans have been finalized to renovate the station building and platforms by the town of Lyndhurst and New Jersey Transit. The plans include new protected waiting areas, new ticketing locations and better ADA-accepted access to the platform, and will cost $22 million.

NJ Transit announced on September 9, 2020 that a $18.5 million contract was approved for the new Lyndhurst station. The new station will be designed to "replicate the historic style of the Lyndhurst neighborhood" and will be located south of the present station, at Delafield Avenue and Court Avenue.

Station layout

The station has two tracks, each with a low-level side platform.

Bibliography

References

External links

 Court Avenue entrance from Google Maps Street View

Lyndhurst, New Jersey
NJ Transit Rail Operations stations
Railway stations in the United States opened in 1870
Former Delaware, Lackawanna and Western Railroad stations
1870 establishments in New Jersey